Shahrdari Bushehr Football Club is an Iranian football club based in Bushehr, Iran. They  compete in the 3rd Division, and hold home games at the Shahid Beheshti Stadium.

Defunct football clubs in Iran
Bushehr County